The Valley of Tears is a Quebec film produced, written and directed by Maryanne Zéhil, starring Nathalie Coupal, Joseph Antaki, Nathalie Mallette, Sophie Cadieux, Henri Chassé, Wafa Tarabey, Layla Hakim and Janine Sutto. It is Zehil's second full-length feature film.

Plot 
The film recounts the 1982 massacres in the Palestinian refugee camps of Sabra and Shatila, Lebanon. Marie, a Montreal publisher, receives a written testimony from a man named Ali, who experienced the events firsthand. Marie is unaware that Joseph, a Lebanese employee of the publishing house, is the real author of the testimony. One day, Joseph goes missing.

Cast

Inspiration 
Setting her story amidst the unpunished genocide of the 1982 massacres, Zehil raises the question of the responsibility of mothers in sending their sons to their deaths. Her film suggests that if Arab and Israeli mothers were held partly accountable, they might stop passing their thirst for revenge on to their children. To evoke the horrors of this setting, Zehil drew heavily on her experience working as a journalist in her native country of Lebanon.

Festivals 
 Bengaluru International Film Festival, India 2012 (World Cinema)
Chennai International Film Festival, India 2012 (World Cinema)
Dubaï International Film Festival, United Arab Emirates 2012 (Arabian Nights)
World premiere at Shanghai International Film Festival, China 2012
Cairo International Film Festival, Egypt 2012 (Human Rights)
Best Fiction Award at the 3rd Greenpoint Film Festival, New York 2013
Presented at the Beirut International Film Festival, Lebanon 2013 (Panorama section)
Cleveland International Film Festival, USA 2013
Fajr International Film Festival, Iran 2014

References

External links 

 Film website
 The Valley of Tears on the website of the production company Mia Productions

2012 films
Canadian drama films
2012 drama films
Quebec films
Films set in Montreal
French-language Canadian films
2010s Canadian films